Rais Neza Boneza (born 1979) is a Congolese writer and poet.

Biography
He was born in the Katanga province in Democratic Republic of Congo (former Zaïre). He is the author of fiction, poetry, articles and academic materials. His works include traditional Congolese themes, and the mysterious Erik Khafizov, a recurring character in his works. He is also a peace activist and practitioner. For his contribution to peace and conflict transformation, he was awarded an honorary doctorate degree (honoris causa) from the Institute of Management Sciences (ISGM) and the Universite du CEPROMEC in Burundi in 2008.

He is co-convener for Africa of the Transcend Global Network, a peace development environment network. His debut novel, White Eldorado, Black Fever (2013), is the only work that has been translated from his native French. He attempts to create awareness about the conflict and the direct effects to communities in the Great Lakes region of Africa.

Bibliography
 Nomad, a refugee poet (2003) 
 Black Emerald (2004) 
 Peace by African's Peaceful Means (2005) 
 Peace through African's Peaceful Means (2003) 
 Sounds of exile (2006)

References

 Author website
 Global torment
 La liste d'ecrivains africains par pays
 Transcend Network for Peace and Development

External links

Living people
1979 births
Democratic Republic of the Congo poets